Eulepidotis fortissima is a moth of the family Erebidae first described by Harrison Gray Dyar Jr. in 1914. It is found in the Neotropics, including Ecuador, Guyana and the Brazilian state of Rio de Janeiro.

References

Moths described in 1914
fortissima